Alan Jay Gerson (born November 1, 1957) is a former Democratic Party member of the New York City Council, first elected in 2001, and reelected in 2005, to represent the 1st district in Manhattan. Prior to that Gerson served as Chair of Manhattan Community Board 2 from 1998 to 1999, serving on its board from 1990 to 2001. Gerson lost the Democratic Primary to Margaret Chin on September 15, 2009, following previous challenges by her in the 2001 and 2004 primaries. The district is located in Lower Manhattan and includes Tribeca, portions of the Lower East Side, Chinatown, Little Italy, Greenwich Village, and the Financial District.

Gerson is a lifelong New York City resident and graduate of P.S. 41, I.S. 70, and Stuyvesant High School (1975). He graduated Phi Beta Kappa and magna cum laude from Columbia College of Columbia University (1979), and was a Harlan Fiske Stone Scholar from Columbia Law School. He was an aide to New York State Assembly Member William Passannante. Gerson practiced law with Kelley Drye & Warren for 18 years.

References

External links
 Official Campaign Site for Alan J. Gerson

New York City Council members
New York (state) Democrats
Stuyvesant High School alumni
1957 births
Living people
Columbia College (New York) alumni
Lawyers from New York City
People from Manhattan